HMS Fairfield was a Hunt-class minesweeper of the Royal Navy from World War I.

References
 

 

Hunt-class minesweepers (1916)
Royal Navy ship names
1919 ships